Triathlon at the 2016 South Asian Games were held in Guwahati, India from 13 – 14 February 2016.

The sport made its South Asian Games debut.

Medalists

Medal table

References

External links
Results

2016 South Asian Games
Events at the 2016 South Asian Games
South Asian Games
Triathlon at the South Asian Games